Abdul Jabbar is an Asom Gana Parishad politician from Assam. He was elected in Assam Legislative Assembly election in 1985, 1991 and 2001 from Dalgaon constituency.

References 

Living people
Asom Gana Parishad politicians
Assam MLAs 1985–1991
Assam MLAs 1991–1996
Assam MLAs 2001–2006
People from Darrang district
Year of birth missing (living people)